Rock in Rio is a live album and video by English heavy metal band Iron Maiden, recorded at the Rock in Rio festival, Brazil in 2001 on the last night of the Brave New World Tour. The band played to approximately 250,000 people; the second largest crowd of their career (the band's largest concert attendance was their 1985 Rock In Rio performance to an audience of 350,000) and with the relatively recent return of lead singer Bruce Dickinson and guitarist Adrian Smith to the band, they recorded their fifth live release.

It features many of their most well-known tracks, including the eponymous "Iron Maiden" and "Run to the Hills," along with six songs from Brave New World, such as "The Wicker Man" and the title track. Also performed were two tracks from the Blaze Bayley-era, "Sign of the Cross" and "The Clansman".

The video release, which was issued on DVD, VHS and UMD, was edited by bassist and founder member Steve Harris. In addition to the concert, the second disc also includes three special features with interviews with band members, a short documentary on the day in the life of Iron Maiden, and photos by official photographer, Ross Halfin.

Background
Iron Maiden's performance at Rock in Rio festival was the final show of their 2000-01 tour, Brave New World Tour. Due to the magnitude of the event (the concert was performed to 250,000 people on the day and an estimated worldwide TV audience of over one billion), the band decided that it should be the basis of their next double live album and first concert DVD release.

To film the concert, the band hired American director Dean Karr, who had previously worked with the group on "The Wicker Man" music video. According to Karr, eighteen cameras were used to capture the show in Rio and additional footage for the DVD was shot throughout their South American tour. This included a performance in Chile, during which cameras were attached to the band's guitars and on singer Bruce Dickinson's shoulders. Dickinson was not pleased with the placement of some cameras at the Rio show and confesses that he had a "little temperamental moment" when he found one blocking a ladder up to his catwalk, which he promptly destroyed.

In spite of this, Dickinson remembers the show very fondly, stating that it was "a fantastic way to end the tour" and that "the energy we expended that night was just incredible". Although he agreed that the band "played well", bassist Steve Harris' enjoyment of the gig was hampered by technical difficulties. Due to the PA malfunctioning on the edge of the stage, Harris "had to stay firmly within my area for the whole night", which meant that he could not interact with the crowd as much as he would have wished.

Although he had been behind the band's previous two concert films, Maiden England (1989) and Donington Live 1992, Harris decided not to edit the project himself, stating that he "wanted a fresh pair of eyes on Maiden. I was after someone else's input and direction over my style", and a professional editing company was hired instead. These circumstances changed, however, when he first saw the edits while producing the soundtrack with Kevin Shirley in New York. According to Harris, the editors had opted for several "styling decisions", including "deliberately out of focus shots of the lighting rig", which "just horrified us". In addition, the crew had also lost the footage from two cameras, which meant that there were very few shots of guitarists Dave Murray and Adrian Smith.

To remedy the situation, Harris reluctantly decided to undertake the editing work himself, despite being "burnt out and ready for time off" following the tour's conclusion. To achieve the desired results, Harris had to teach himself how to use complex digital editing systems and installed all the necessary equipment in his home studio in Essex. Although this meant over six months editing, which led to a postponed release date, Harris was pleased with the results and argues that it is better than their first concert film, Live After Death.

Track listing

DVD bonus features
 Candid interviews with the band members.
 "A Day in the Life" of Iron Maiden.
 Ross Halfin Photo Diary – 50 exclusive photos from Iron Maiden's South American Tour, commentary from official photographer, Ross Halfin.
 Several secret short videos.

Personnel
Production and performance credits are adapted from the album and DVD liner notes.

Iron Maiden
Bruce Dickinson – lead vocals
Dave Murray – lead and rhythm guitars
Adrian Smith – lead and rhythm guitars, backing vocals
Janick Gers – lead and rhythm guitars
Steve Harris – bass, backing vocals
Nicko McBrain — drums

Additional musicians
Michael Kenney – keyboards

Production
Kevin Shirley – producer, engineer, mixing
Claudius Mittendorfer – assistant engineer
Dean Karr – director (video), photography
Arthur Gorson – producer (video)
Mick Hutson – cover photography
Ross Halfin – photography
Peacock – sleeve design, sleeve concept
Rod Smallwood – management
Andy Taylor – management
Merck Mercuriadis – management

Charts

Album

Video

Certifications

Album

Video

References

External links 

Albums produced by Kevin Shirley
Iron Maiden live albums
2002 live albums
EMI Records live albums
Live heavy metal albums
Iron Maiden video albums
2002 video albums
Live video albums
Sanctuary Records live albums
Sanctuary Records video albums

pl:Rock in Rio (album)#Film